Archbishop Hanna may refer to the following people.

Edward Joseph Hanna, Roman Catholic Archbishop of San Francisco
Archbishop Theodosios (Hanna) of Sebastia, Eastern Orthodox Archbishop of Sebastia